Michèle Bernard (born 26 October 1947) is a French singer and songwriter.

Discography 
 1988 : Michèle Bernard en Public 
 1992 : Des nuits noires de monde
 1997 : Nomade     (Chansons pour les petits et les grands) 
 1997 : Quand vous me rendrez visite
 1999 : Voler...
 2002 : Mes premiers vinyls 
 2002 : Une fois qu'on s'est tout dit
 2004 : Poésies pour les enfants
 2004 : L'oiseau noir du champ fauve, cantate pour Louise Michel
 2006 : Le nez en l'air
 2008 : Piano Voix
 2008 : Monsieur je m'en fous 
 2010 : Des nuits noires de monde Live
 2012 : Sens Dessus Dessous

Awards
 Grand Prix musique jeune public ADAMI 2013

References

1947 births
French singer-songwriters
French women singers
French children's musicians
Living people
Musicians from Lyon